Pavone del Mella is a comune in the province of Brescia, in Lombardy. It is situated on the left bank of the river Mella.

References

Cities and towns in Lombardy